Little Constellation is a network of contemporary art focus on geopolitical micro-areas of Europe.

The project involves Cyprus, Iceland, Liechtenstein, Luxembourg, Malta, Monaco, Montenegro, San Marino, Canton Ticino, Ceuta, Faroe Islands, Gibilterra, Guernsey, Jersey and Kaliningrad, through diaries, photos and videos, interviews with institutional representatives and meetings with artists.

Contemporary art organizations